Robert John Sutherland Munro (born 2 April 1946) is a former New Zealand politician of the National Party, serving as Member of Parliament for Invercargill from 1987 to 1993.

Early life
Munro was born in Dunedin on 2 April 1946.

Military service
Aged 17, Munro enlisted in the New Zealand Army in January 1964. On 13 December 1967, he graduated from the Royal Military College.

In November 1970 with the rank of captain, Munro was posted to General Staff (Intelligence) Section Headquarters, 1st Australian Task Force, at Nui Dat in Vietnam. There he was responsible for compiling the enemy order-of-battle, requiring him to analyse the organisation and capability of enemy units. In June 1971, he was given the duties of General Staff Officer Grade Three (Intelligence), in which role he received, prepared and distributed daily intelligence reports, and briefed interrogation teams, aerial reconnaissance pilots, unit commanders and visitors. For his diligent and dedicated performance of those duties, he was mentioned in despatches in March 1972.

After returning to New Zealand, Munro served at Defence Headquarters, commanded 161 Battery RNZA in Papakura and later Waiouru Training Depot. He reached the rank of lieutenant colonel. After discharge from the NZ Army he worked in Wellington as a lawyer.

In 2019, Munro was presented his mention in despatch award by the governor-general, Dame Patsy Reddy, in a ceremony at Government House, Wellington.

Member of Parliament

Munro represented the Invercargill electorate in Parliament from 1987, when he replaced Norman Jones to 1993, when he was defeated by Mark Peck.

References

1946 births
Living people
New Zealand National Party MPs
New Zealand Conservative Party politicians
Members of the New Zealand House of Representatives
New Zealand MPs for South Island electorates
Unsuccessful candidates in the 1993 New Zealand general election
New Zealand Army officers
New Zealand military personnel of the Vietnam War
Politicians from Dunedin
People from Invercargill
Military personnel from Dunedin